Wang Kenan (3 August 1980 – 5 October 2013) was a Chinese diver who competed in the 2004 Summer Olympics. In early October 2013 he was in Tianjin to serve as a judge for the 2013 East Asian Games, but died in a car accident.

References

External links

1980 births
2013 deaths
Chinese male divers
Olympic divers of China
Divers at the 2004 Summer Olympics
Asian Games medalists in diving
Divers at the 2002 Asian Games
Road incident deaths in the People's Republic of China
Asian Games gold medalists for China
Medalists at the 2002 Asian Games
Universiade medalists in diving
Universiade gold medalists for China
Medalists at the 1999 Summer Universiade
Medalists at the 2001 Summer Universiade
Medalists at the 2003 Summer Universiade
Medalists at the 2005 Summer Universiade
Medalists at the 2007 Summer Universiade
World Aquatics Championships medalists in diving
20th-century Chinese people
21st-century Chinese people